This is a list of the episodes from the first series of the anime series Nintama Rantarō. The series aired from April 10, 1993, to March 19, 1994, on NHK for a total of 47 episodes. This is the only series to be 26 minutes and have episodes containing two 11-minute segments (with the expectation of episode 38, which there's three segments instead of two). The series was shortened to a 10-minute format starting from series 2. 

The series' opening theme is Yūki 100% (勇気100% Yūki Hyaku Pāsento, "Courage 100%") by Hikaru Genji. The ending theme is Dancing Junk (ダンシング ジャンク) by Super Monkey's.

The series was released on VHS by Pony Canyon across twenty-two volumes, each containing four individual segments except for the last volume, which contains two full episodes along with filler material. The series was later released on DVD by Geneon Entertainment across two box sets. The first volume, containing episodes 1 through 24, was released on September 24, 2004. The second volume, containing episodes 25, 27, and 29 through 47, was released on December 22, 2004. For unknown reasons, episodes 26 and 28 are not included on the box set. Due to music licensing issues, the box sets do not include the season's ending theme.

Episode list

Notes

References

External links
 Series 1 episode list

1993 Japanese television seasons
1994 Japanese television seasons
Nintama Rantarō episode lists